Dalham is a village and civil parish in the West Suffolk district of Suffolk, England. The name, meaning 'homestead/village in a valley' is of Old English origin and first recorded in the Domesday Book.

The Icknield Way Path passes through the village on its 110-mile journey from Ivinghoe Beacon in Buckinghamshire to Knettishall Heath in Suffolk. The Icknield Way Trail, a multi-user route for walkers, horse riders and off-road cyclists also passes through the village.

Dalham Hall

In 1901 the estate of Dalham Hall was bought by Cecil Rhodes. After he died in 1902 without taking possession, his brother Colonel Francis William Rhodes became the owner, and erected the village hall in his brother's memory.

Dalham Hall and its associated stud are owned by the ruler of Dubai, Sheikh Mohammed bin Rashid Al Maktoum.

Notable residents
Gilbert Affleck c. 1684 – 1764, Member of Parliament (MP) for Cambridge
Philip Affleck c. 1726 – 1799, Admiral, commander-in-chief of the Jamaica Station and Lord of the Board of Admiralty

References

External links

Villages in Suffolk
Forest Heath
Civil parishes in Suffolk